Cliffton Ho' (born 19 December 1985) is an international TV host, producer & director.

Career 

In late 2009, Cliff became a DJ & hosted Club Max on 103.5 Max FM.

In 2009 Cliff started hosting for Channel V Philippines & soon after Channel V International.

Cliff has interviewed Kanye West, Miley Cyrus, Usher (entertainer), LMFAO (group), Black Eyed Peas, Ne-Yo, Armin Van Buuren & Jason Mraz.

Cliff is currently an International Host, for Fox International Channels, which is based in Hong Kong & show in 33 countries around Asia.  Cliff also co hosts ‘The Source’ Asia's highest rating lifestyle show with Georgina Wilson on Star World

Timeline

References

1985 births
Living people
Australian television presenters
VJs (media personalities)
Filipino television presenters